Ingenious Animals is a BBC nature documentary which aired on BBC One in September 2016. The series ran for four episodes and looks at various aspects of animals and how they relate to each other and the environment.

The series is presented by Hugh Fearnley-Whittingstall and other wildlife experts visiting a variety of locations around the world including Florida, The Bahamas and Kenya.

Episodes 
A total of four hour-long episodes were aired as part of the series.

 Intelligence (1 September 2016)
 Relationships (8 September 2016)
 Communication (15 September 2016)
 Bodies (22 September 2016)

References

External links 
 

2016 British television series debuts
2016 British television series endings
BBC high definition shows
BBC television documentaries
Television series about animals
English-language television shows